Shot in the Dark may refer to:

Books
A Shot in the Dark, a 1952 novel by Richard P. Powell

Film, television, and theatre

Film
A Shot in the Dark (1933 film), a British film directed by George Pearson
A Shot in the Dark (1935 film), an American film directed by Charles Lamont
A Shot in the Dark (1941 film), a film directed by William C. McGann 
A Shot in the Dark (1947 film), also known as Dragnet and Dark Bullet
A Shot in the Dark (1964 film), a Pink Panther film directed by Blake Edwards
Shot in the Dark, a 2002 documentary by Adrian Grenier

Television
"A Shot in the Dark" (Homicide: Life on the Street), a 1993 episode of the TV series Homicide: Life on the Street
"Shot in the Dark" (Haven), an episode of the TV show Haven
"A Shot in the Dark" (Family Guy), a 2015 episode of the TV show Family Guy
Shot in the Dark (TV series), a 2017 Netflix show

Theatre
L'Idiote, or A Shot in the Dark, a play by Marcel Achard, adapted for the 1964 film

Music

Albums
Shot in the Dark, an album by The Inmates
Shot in the Dark (album), a 1986 album by Great White
Shot in the Dark, a 1977 album by Bill Quateman

Songs
"Shot in the Dark" (Ozzy Osbourne song), 1986
"Shot in the Dark" (AC/DC song), 2020
"Shot in the Dark" (Within Temptation song), 2011
"Shot in the Dark", a song by RJD2 from Deadringer
Shot in the Dark, a rock band that backed up Al Stewart on several of his albums
"Shot in the Dark", a 1986 song by the Canadian band Haywire
"Shot in the Dark", a 2011 song by the American band Augustana from their self-titled album Augustana
"Shot in the Dark", a song by Belinda Carlisle from her 1986 album Belinda
"Shot in the Dark", a 2014 song by The Magic Numbers
"Shot in the Dark", a 1982 song by Patty Weaver
"A Shot in the Dark", a song by Henry Mancini, also performed by Tony Osborne, Joe Loss, The Jets, and Roland Alphonso
"A Shot in the Dark", a song by A Day to Remember from For Those Who Have Heart

Other uses
Shot in the dark (drink), a coffee drink

See also
Bahrain: Shouting in the Dark, a television documentary film produced by the news channel Al Jazeera English about the Bahraini uprising of 2011